The Amphitheatre of Old Havana is an outdoor auditorium built by the Secretaría de Obras Públicas in 1936 on the Avenida del Puerto.

History
The Amphitheatre of Old Havana was designed by architects Eugenio Batista and Aquiles Maza. It was inaugurated on May 20, 1936, on the Avenida del Puerto, with a concert by the Municipal Band under the direction of maestro Guillermo Tomás.
One of the most important events that took place in this coliseum was the revival, in the year of its inauguration, of the Cuban zarzuela Cecilia Valdés, directed by its own author, the Cuban composer Gonzalo Roig.  Also memorable were the performances by Bertha Singerman, Rita Montaner, Pedro Vargas, Benny Moré and Libertad Lamarque in the 1950s, and the concerts by the National Concert Band, of which the Amphitheater was the official venue until the 1960s. Very popular festivals among Havanans and other artistic events of national and international significance have been held in the center. In 1995, it was the object of restoration by the Heritage Directorate of the City Historian's Office, Eusebio Leal, which restored its original appearance.

Gallery

See also

 Havana Plan Piloto

Notes

References

Buildings and structures in Havana
Architecture in Havana